The Apotheosis of Palermo is a fresco by Vito D'Anna in the Palazzo Isnello, Palermo, Italy, considered one of the most representative works of the Sicilian Baroque painting.

It is one of the seven monumental representations of the Genius of Palermo.

Description 
The fresco is an allegory representing the apotheosis of the city of Palermo, personified by the Genius of Palermo, numen protector of the city, surrounded by allegorical figure, as Fame, Justice, Abundance, and others mythological figures.

The painting, signed and dated 1760 by Vito D'Anna, is at the noble floor of Palazzo Isnello, on the vault of the bellroom.

See also 
Rococo

References

Bibliography 
Citti Siracusano, La pittura del Settecento in Sicilia. Rome, De Luca, 1986.
Sergio Troisi, Vito D'Anna. Palermo, «Kalos», issue 4, July/August, 1993.
Rita Cedrini. Repertorio delle dimore nobili e notabili nella Sicilia del XVIII secolo. Palermo, Regione Siciliana BBCCAA, 2003.
Giulia Sommariva. Palazzi nobiliari a Palermo. Palermo, Flaccovio, 2004. 
Mariny Guttilla. Cantieri decorativi a Palermo dal tardo barocco alle soglie del neoclassicismo, in Il Settecento e il suo doppio. Palermo, Kalós, 2008, p. 177–206.

Notes 

1760 paintings
Baroque paintings
Fresco paintings in Palermo